"Flou" is a song by Belgian singer Angèle which was released as a single on July 5, 2019. It is the seventh single from her first album Brol.

Weekly charts

Sources 

Angèle (singer) songs
2018 songs